Wagner High School can refer to:

 Karen Wagner High School, San Antonio, Texas, United States
 Susan E. Wagner High School, Staten Island, New York, United States
 W.P. Wagner High School, Edmonton, Alberta, Canada
 Wagner High School (Clark Air Base), Philippines